Sakai is a tribal community in Indonesia, traditionally living in the interior of Riau, Sumatra. Some of them still lead  a  nomadic and hunter-gatherer lifestyle in the remote interior of Sumatra, while most settled into major cities and towns in Sumatra with the rise of industrialization.

There are various theories of their origin. One theory is  that they are the descendants of the Proto-Malay and Negrito tribes that were pushed inland due to the arrival of the Malay people in Sumatra. Some of them claim that they are of Minangkabau origin and migrated to the edge of Gasib River, upstream of Rokan River, Riau hinterland in the 14th century. The Sakai people considered themselves to have originate from Pagaruyung Kingdom.

Most of the Sakai community living today are involved in agriculture. There are no definite data about the number of Sakai. Population data issued by the Ministry of Social Affairs Republic of Indonesia stated that the number of Sakai in Bengkalis Regency of 4,995 inhabitants.

References

Ethnic groups in Indonesia
Ethnic groups in Sumatra
Minangkabau